The 1950 Missouri Tigers football team was an American football team that represented the University of Missouri in the Big Seven Conference (Big 7) during the 1950 college football season. The team compiled a 4–5–1 record (3–2–1 against Big 7 opponents), finished in third place in the Big 7, and was outscored by all opponents by a combined total of 215 to 166. Don Faurot was the head coach for the 13th of 19 seasons. The team played its home games at Memorial Stadium in Columbia, Missouri.

The team's statistical leaders included John Glorioso with 503 rushing yards and 769 yards of total offense, Phil Klein with 625 passing yards, Gene Ackerman with 400 receiving yards, and Ed Stephens with 54 points scored.

Schedule

References

Missouri
Missouri Tigers football seasons
Missouri Tigers football